Neno may refer to:
Neno (name), list of nicknames, given names and surnames
Neno District, a district of Malawi